The 17th Stinkers Bad Movie Awards were released by the Hastings Bad Cinema Society in 1995 to honour the worst films the film industry had to offer in 1994. Founder Mike Lancaster put Ready to Wear as the one 1994 film among his five worst movies of the 1990s, alongside It's Pat, Kids, Lost in Space, and Nothing but Trouble. Listed as follows are the different categories with their respective winners and nominees, including Worst Picture and its dishonourable mentions, which are films that were considered for Worst Picture but ultimately failed to make the final ballot (30 total). All winners are highlighted.

Winners and Nominees

Worst Picture

Dishonourable Mentions

 Ace Ventura: Pet Detective (Warner Bros.)
 Airheads (Fox)
 Beverly Hills Cop III (Paramount)
 Blankman (Columbia)
 City Slickers II (Columbia)
 Color of Night (Hollywood)
 The Cowboy Way (Universal)
 Dumb and Dumber (New Line)
 Even Cowgirls Get the Blues (Fine Line)
 Exit to Eden (Savoy)
 The Flintstones (Universal)
 Frankenstein (aka Mary Shelley's Frankenstein) (TriStar)
 The Getaway (Universal)
 Getting Even With Dad (MGM)
 Highlander III: The Final Dimension (Miramax)
 I'll Do Anything (Columbia)
 Intersection (Paramount)
 Interview with the Vampire (Warner Bros.)
 Lightning Jack (Savoy)
 Little Indian, Big City (Buena Vista)
 Love Affair (Warner Bros.)
 Major League II (Warner Bros.)
 Mixed Nuts (TriStar)
 On Deadly Ground (Warner Bros.)
 The Pagemaster (Fox)
 Pulp Fiction (Miramax)
 Ready to Wear (aka Prêt-à-Porter) (Miramax)
 Richie Rich (Warner Bros.)
 The Swan Princess (New Line)
 Wyatt Earp (Warner Bros.)

Other Categories

References

Stinkers Bad Movie Awards
Stinkers Bad Movie Awards